MYL could refer to:

 Maryland railway station, England, National Rail code
 McCall Municipal Airport, Valley County, Idaho, US, IATA airport code
 Muslim Youth League, the youth wing of the Indian Union Muslim League
 Mylan Laboratories Inc., NASDAQ symbol